Dioryctria pygmaeella, the baldcypress coneworm moth, is a species of snout moth in the genus Dioryctria. It was described by Émile Louis Ragonot in 1887 and is restricted to the coastal plains of the eastern United States and eastern Texas.

There are up to three generations per year.

The larvae feed within the cones of Taxodium distichum and Taxodium ascendens. The young larvae eat the chorion and bore into the cone after making exploratory holes.

References

Moths described in 1887
pygmaeella